Craig Topolnisky (born October 8, 1957) is a Canadian-born former professional ice hockey defenceman.

During the 1977–78 season, Topolnisky played 10 games in the World Hockey Association with the Edmonton Oilers.

Career statistics

References

External links

1957 births
Living people
Calgary Centennials players
Canadian ice hockey defencemen
Düsseldorfer EG players
EC Hannover Turtles players
Edmonton Oilers (WHA) players
EHC Freiburg players
Kamloops Chiefs players
Rote Teufel Bad Nauheim players
Spokane Flyers players
Ice hockey people from Edmonton
Western International Hockey League players